A.Tamil Selvan is an Indian film director who has directed Tamil-language films. He made his debut with the film Kida Virunthu (2017) after he did Udhay Art of Love (2019) and Kaayam (2021).

Career 
A. Tamil Selvan made his directorial debut through the action drama Kida Virunthu (2017), featuring Ganja Karuppu, G. M. Kumar and S. P. Prasadh. He worked on the story, screenplay, dialogue, and lyrics for the film.

The film opened to mixed reviews, with a reviewer from Maalai Malar "Director A.S. Tamilchelvan has given the film the title "Kida Virundhu," which is known as a village feast. He attempted to provide the picture without altering the smell of the soil. The film contains numerous instances of reality violations."  After the film Kida Virunthu, his next film, Udhay Art of Love, was released in 2019 and starred Udhay, Kadhal Sukumar, and Nellai Siva.

The film opened to mixed reviews, with Maalai Malar mentioning, "He has made the film based on love and caste.Many scenes are reminiscent of scenes from other films. If the screenplay had been interesting, the film could have been enjoyable." Then A.Tamilselvan Begin to do Kaayam in 2021. After a year, Tamil Selvan's film Vizhithelu got mixed reviews. A critic from Dina Thanthi said, "Director A. Tamil Selvan tells the story with a sense of responsibility and moves the scenes briskly to raise awareness about internet scams."

Filmography

References 

Living people
21st-century Indian film directors
Film directors from Chennai
Tamil film directors
Tamil screenwriters
Year of birth missing (living people)